Egypt is an unincorporated community in Effingham County, in the U.S. state of Georgia.

History
A post office called Egypt was established in 1850, and remained in operation until 1956. The community was named after Egypt, alluding to that country's fertile soil.

References

Unincorporated communities in Effingham County, Georgia